Matthew "Matt" R. Auer is an American academic administrator and environmental scholar. Auer served as the dean of faculty and vice president for academic affairs at Bates College in Lewiston, Maine before being appointed the current Dean of the University of Georgia School of Public and International Affairs in Athens, Georgia; he assumed office on July 1, 2017.

Auer had also previously served as the Dean of the Hutton Honors College at Indiana University in Bloomington, Indiana, and was a professor at the Indiana University School of Public and Environmental Affairs.

Early life and education 
Auer earned an AB in Anthropology, magna cum laude, from Harvard College in 1988, a Master of Arts in Law and Diplomacy from the Fletcher School of Law and Diplomacy, Tufts University, and a Ph.D. in Forestry and Environmental Studies from Yale University in 1996.

Early educational career 
He is the former Dean of the Hutton Honors College at Indiana University in Bloomington, Indiana. At Indiana University, he taught environmental policy, public policy, and public administration at Indiana University School of Public and Environmental Affairs.

Society of Policy Scientists 

From 2005 to 2008, he was editor-in-chief of the public policy journal, Policy Sciences, and he currently serves on the Executive Council of the Society of Policy Scientists.

U.S. Forest Service 
Auer served as Senior Adviser to the U.S. Forest Service from 2001 to 2006. During that time, he was a member of the U.S. delegation to the United Nations Forum on Forests and to the International Tropical Timber Council, the governing body of the International Tropical Timber Organization (ITTO). For the United States Agency for International Development and other bilateral aid agencies, he has developed, implemented, and evaluated energy and environmental programs in, among other countries, the Dominican Republic, Mexico, Ecuador, Bolivia, Chile, Estonia, Poland, Azerbaijan, Thailand, Laos, and Vietnam. He has also served as a Presidential Management Fellow at USAID.

Bates College 
Auer was appointed as the Dean of Faculty of Bates College on July 1, 2013. Auer has received more than a dozen teaching awards including the President's Award. On February 1, 2017, it was announced that Auer was appointed to a senior level position within the University of Georgia by the college's president, Clayton Spencer.

University of Georgia 
In early February 2017, the University of Georgia  announced that Auer had been named dean of the University of Georgia School of Public and International Affairs. He assumed office on July 1, 2017 following an induction ceremony.

Notable publications 
 Auer, Matthew. 2008. “Presidential Environmental Appointees in Comparative Perspective,” Public Administration Review, 68(1): 68-80.
 Auer, Matthew. 2006. “Contexts, Multiple Methods, and Values in the Study of Common-Pool Resources,” Journal of Policy Analysis and Management, 25(1): 215-227.
 Auer, Matthew. 2004. (Ed.) Restoring Cursed Earth: Appraising Environmental Policy Reforms in Eastern Europe and Russia. Lanham, MD: Rowman & Littlefield.
 Auer, Matthew. 2000. “Who Participates in Global Environmental Governance?  Partial Answers from International Relations Theory,” Policy Sciences, 33(2): 155-180.
 Auer, Matthew. 1998. “Colleagues or Combatants?  Experts as Environmental Diplomats,” International Negotiation, 3(2): 267-287.

References

External links 
 Indiana University Hutton Honors College
 Policy Sciences journal
 International Tropical Timber Organization

Harvard College alumni
Yale School of Forestry & Environmental Studies alumni
Indiana University faculty
Living people
Year of birth missing (living people)
The Fletcher School at Tufts University alumni